
Kwidzyn County is a unit of territorial administration and local government (powiat) in Pomeranian Voivodeship, northern Poland. It came into being on January 1, 1999, as a result of the Polish local government reforms passed in 1998.

As of 2019 its total population is 83,231, out of which the population of Kwidzyn is 38,444, that of Prabuty is 8,695, and the rural population is 36,092.

Kwidzyn County on a map of the counties of Pomeranian Voivodeship

Kwidzyn County is bordered by Tczew County to the west, Sztum County to the north, Iława County to the east, Grudziądz County to the south and Świecie County to the south-west.

Administrative division
The county is subdivided into six gminas (one urban, one urban-rural and four rural). These are listed in the following table, in descending order of population.

References

 
Kwidzyn